South Tama County Community School District (STC) is a rural public school district headquartered in Tama, Iowa.

Service area
Almost all of the district is in Tama County while a small portion is in Poweshiek County. The district serves, in addition to Tama, Chelsea, Montour, Toledo, and Vining. It also serves the Meskwaki Settlement, a Native American settlement, and other areas. Typically, Meskwaki Nation students attend the Meskwaki Settlement School and move on to South Tama County High School.

History

In July 2018, Jared Smith became the superintendent. He previously was the principal of Muscatine High School. He received a two-year contract renewal in February 2020.

In 2020, there was a vote to pass a school bond that would rebuild the middle school as an attachment to the high school building in Tama, which would mean the end of use of the Toledo building. Unofficial results as of March 6, 2020, stated that the vote was 53.9% in favor by a margin of 844–722; it failed due to the percentage of voters being below the required 60%. There was opposition from figures who believed that the district did not give sufficient details about the project.

Later that month the district considered another vote.

Enrollment
, the district as a whole had over 1,500 students.

Schools
South Tama County Elementary, Tama
South Tama County Middle School, Toledio
South Tama County High School, Tama

South Tama County High School

Athletics
The Trojans compete in the WaMaC Conference in the following sports:

Baseball
Basketball (boys and girls)
Bowling
Cross Country (boys and girls)
Football
Golf (boys and girls)
 Girls' Class 2A State Champions - 1998
Soccer (boys and girls)
Softball
Swimming (boys and girls)
Tennis (boys and girls)
Track and Field (boys and girls)
Volleyball
Wrestling

See also
List of school districts in Iowa
List of high schools in Iowa

References

External links
 South Tama County Community School District
 Article index about the district - Tama News-Herald/Toledo Chronicle

School districts in Iowa
Education in Poweshiek County, Iowa
Education in Tama County, Iowa